Tiz Ab (also Romanized as Tīz Āb) is a village in Miyan Khaf Rural District, in the Central District of Khaf County, Razavi Khorasan Province, Iran. At the 2006 census, its population was 1,017, in 236 families.

References 

Populated places in Khaf County